John Carroll (born 1944) is Emeritus Professor of Sociology at La Trobe University in Melbourne, Australia.

Work
John Carroll is the author of Puritan, Paranoid, Remissive, Guilt, Ego and Soul, Humanism: The Rebirth and Wreck of Western Culture, and Intruders In The Bush: The Australian Quest For Identity. His Cambridge doctoral dissertation on epistemological anarchistic and anti-rationalist themes in Max Stirner, Nietzsche and Dostoyevsky was published as Breakout from the Crystal Palace (1974). It was supervised by George Steiner. Puritan, Paranoid, Remissive (1977) echoed and developed upon themes in Philip Rieff's Triumph of the Therapeutic: Uses of Faith after Freud (1966).

Humanism (1993; 2010) is Carroll's most ambitious work to date. Predicated on the view that Western high culture is in a declining if not nihilistic mode, Humanism traces this decline to an epistemic tyranny of reason and its subjection of other forms of knowing and understanding being. Carroll's often bleak diagnosis is primarily based on unique readings of canonic theological, philosophical and artistic texts including those by Sophocles, Calvin, Holbein, Donatello, Shakespeare, Rembrandt, Poussin, Henry James and John Ford. The heart of the book's analysis is highly indebted to Nietzsche's critique of "Socratic" culture in The Birth of Tragedy. Terror: a Meditation on the Meaning of September 11 (2004) is an application of many of the themes in the former work.

In The Western Dreaming and The Existential Jesus, Carroll rereads Gospel narratives and the ontology of Christ through a Heideggerian and non-theistic lens. Greek Pilgrimage is an unabashedly hellenophilic meditation on the nature of ancient Greek aesthetics and culture and what remains of the archaeological sites themselves. His latest book, Land of the Golden Cities, on the sources of Australia's current prosperity, was published by Connor Court in 2017.

A book of essays about his work, Metaphysical Sociology: On the Work of John Carroll, edited by Sara James, was published by Routledge in 2018. It includes Carroll's response to the contributions.

Bibliography

Books
 
 
 Sceptical sociology. London: Routledge & Kegan Paul. 1980
 
 
 Shutdown: The failure of economic rationalism and how to rescue Australia, edited by John Carroll and Robert Manne. Melbourne: Text. 1992.
 Humanism: The wreck of Western culture. London: Fontana. 1993. 
 Ego and soul: The modern West in search of meaning. Pymble, NSW: HarperCollins. 1998.
 The Western dreaming: The Western world is dying for want of a story. Pymble, NSW: HarperCollins. 2001.
 Terror: A meditation on the meaning of September 11. Carlton North: Scribe. 2002.
 The wreck of Western culture: Humanism revisited. Carlton North: Scribe. 2004. (A revised version of Humanism: The wreck of Western culture.)
 The existential Jesus. Carlton North: Scribe. 2007.
 Greek pilgrimage: In search of the foundations of the West. Carlton North: Scribe. 2007.
 Land of the golden cities: Australia's exceptional prosperity & the culture that made it. Redlands Bay, Qld: Connor Court, 2017.
 On Guilt: The Force Shaping Character, History, and Culture. London: Routledge, 2020.

Articles

References

External links 

John Carroll's website
Carroll on Philip Rieff 
Carroll discusses the re-release of Humanism in 2004 
Carroll discussing The Existential Jesus 
Review of Existential Jesus 

1944 births
Living people
Australian non-fiction writers
Academic staff of La Trobe University
Quadrant (magazine) people
Australian sociologists